Acacia depressa, also commonly known as echidna wattle, is a shrub of the genus Acacia and the subgenus Pulchellae that is endemic to south western Australia. It was listed as vulnerable according the Environment Protection and Biodiversity Conservation Act 1999 in 2007.

Description
It blooms from December to January and produces yellow flowers. It forms simple inflorescences that occur singly in the axils and have spherical flower-heads that contain 12 to 15 light golden coloured flowers.

Distribution
It is native to an area in the Wheatbelt region of Western Australia where it is commonly situated on low rocky hills and rises where it grows in gravelly lateritic soils. It has a limited distribution around Lake Grace as a part of low shrubland or open heath communities.

See also
 List of Acacia species

External links

References

depressa
Endemic flora of Southwest Australia
Plants described in 1975
Taxa named by Bruce Maslin